is a Japanese actress. She won the award for best actress at the 8th Yokohama Film Festival for Inujini seshi mono, Minami e Hashire, Umi no Michi o! and Sorobanzuku. She also won the award for best actress at the 13th Hochi Film Award for Bakayaro! I'm Plenty Mad.

Yasuda was born in Tokyo. Initially she was the winner of a competition to find a singer to sing the theme song and promote Hayao Miyazaki's now-popular anime film Nausicaä of the Valley of the Wind, "Kaze no Tani no Naushika", written by Takashi Matsumoto and composed by Haruomi Hosono.

Selected filmography

Films
Inujini seshi mono (1986)
Minami e Hashire, Umi no Michi o! (1986)
Sorobanzuku (1986)
Bakayaro! I'm Plenty Mad (1988)
My Soul Is Slashed (1991)
Time Traveller: The Girl Who Leapt Through Time (2010)
Fukushima 50 (2020)
Under the Open Sky (2021)

Television
 Sugao no Mama De (1992), Yumiko Kosaka
Teppan (2010–2011), Machiko Murakami
Totto TV (2016), Cho Kuroyanagi
Miotsukushi Ryōrichō  (2017)

Dubbing
The Good Dinosaur, Momma Ida

References

External links

1966 births
Living people
Japanese actresses
Asadora lead actors
People from Tokyo